Return Ticket is a 2011 Chinese drama film directed by Teng Yung-shin.

Cast
 Li Bin Bin as Guozi
 Qin Hailu as Cai Li
 Yiquan Shen 沈弈铨 as Jiuzi
 Qun Tang 唐群

References

External links
 

2011 films
2011 drama films
Chinese drama films
2010s Mandarin-language films